A plastome is the genome of a plastid, a type of organelle found in plants and in a variety of protoctists. The number of known plastid genome sequences grew rapidly in the first decade of the twenty-first century.  For example, 25 chloroplast genomes were sequenced for one molecular phylogenetic study.

The flowering plants are especially well represented in complete chloroplast genomes. As of January, 2017, all of their orders are represented except Commelinales, Picramniales, Huerteales, Escalloniales, Bruniales, and Paracryphiales.

A compilation of all available complete plastid genomes is maintained by the NCBI in a public repository.

Plants

Bryophytes s.l.

Ferns and Lycophytes

Gymnosperms

Flowering plants
This sortable table is expected to compile complete plastid genomes representing the largest range of sizes, number of genes, and angiosperm families.

Green algae

Red algae

Glaucophytes

Meta-algae and apicomplexans
Meta-algae are organisms with photosynthetic organelles of secondary or tertiary endosymbiotic origin, and their close non-photosynthetic, plastid-bearing, relatives. Apicomplexans are a secondarily non-photosynthetic group of chromalveoates which retain a reduced plastid organelle.

Photosynthetic chromalveolates
Dinoflagellate plastid genomes are not organised into a single circular DNA molecule like other plastid genomes, but into an array of mini-circles.

Chlorarachniophytes

Euglenophytes

Apicomplexans

Nucleomorph genomes
In some photosynthetic organisms that ability was acquired via symbiosis with a unicellular green alga (chlorophyte) or red alga (rhodophyte). In some such cases not only does the chloroplast of the former unicellular alga retain its own genome, but a remnant of the alga is also retained. When this retains a nucleus and a nuclear genome it is termed a nucleomorph.

Cyanelle genomes
The unicellular eukaryote Paulinella chromatophora possesses an organelle (the cyanelle) which represents an independent case of the acquisition of photosynthesis by cyanobacterial endosymbiosis. (Note: the term cyanelle is also applied to the plastids of glaucophytes.)

See also 
List of sequenced eukaryotic genomes
List of sequenced bacterial genomes
List of sequenced archaeal genomes
Genome skimming

References

External links 
HAMAP proteomes: Plastids
Complete Plastid Genomes
Chloroplast Genome Database
NCBI Eukaryotic Plastid Genomes
chloroplast genome list In: Montreal genomics
Psilotum nudum

Plastomes
Biology-related lists